The Morris water navigation task, also known as the Morris water maze (not to be confused with water maze), is a behavioral procedure mostly used with rodents. It is widely used in behavioral neuroscience to study spatial learning and memory. It enables learning, memory, and spatial working to be studied with great accuracy, and can also be used to assess damage to particular cortical regions of the brain. It is used by neuroscientists to measure the effect of neurocognitive disorders on spatial learning and possible neural treatments, to test the effect of lesions to the brain in areas concerned with memory, and to study how age influences cognitive function and spatial learning. The task is also used as a tool to study drug-abuse, neural systems, neurotransmitters, and brain development.

Overview 

The basic procedure for the Morris water navigation task is that the rat is placed in a large circular pool and is required to find an invisible or visible platform that allows it to escape the water by using various cues. Many factors can influence the rats' performance, including their sex, the environment in which they were raised, exposure to drugs, etc. There are three basic tactics for the rats to escape the maze: a praxic strategy (remembering the movements needed to get to the platform), a taxic strategy (the rat uses visual cues to reach their destinations), or spatial strategy (using distal cues as points of reference to locate themselves). There are a variety of paradigms for the water maze that can be used to examine different cognitive functions. In particular, cognitive flexibility can be assessed using a water maze paradigm in which the hidden platform is continually re-located.

History 
The Morris water navigation task was conceived by Richard G. Morris (then at the University of St Andrews) in 1981 as an alternative to the radial maze. The test was developed to study spatial learning and how it differed from other forms of associative learning. Originally rats, now more commonly mice, were placed in an open pool and the latency to escape was measured for up to six trials a day for 2–14 days. Several variables are used to evaluate an animal's performance. For example, a "probe trial" measures how long the test subject spends in the "target quadrant" (the quadrant with the hidden platform). More elaborate trials alter the location of the hidden platform, or measure distance spent swimming in the pool before reaching the platform. Over the years, many different versions of this test have been performed with a large amount of variables. For example, neuroscientists examine the effect of differences of sex, weight, strength, stress levels, age, and strain of species. The results vary dramatically, so researchers cannot draw conclusions unless these variables are kept constant. Many different size pools have been used throughout the history of this task, but it has been shown that this does not have a significant impact on the results of the test. In early versions of the task, researchers only timed latency to escape, however video tracking devices are now routinely used to measure the path to escape, time spent in each quadrant, and distance traveled in the pool.

Original experiment 
In Morris' first experiment, the apparatus was a large circular pool, 1.30 m across and 0.60 m high. The purpose of the original experiment was to show that spatial learning does not require the presence of local cues, meaning that rats can learn to locate an object without any auditory, visual, or olfactory cues.

Analysis 
The earliest measure of learning is escape latency, which is the time it takes to find the platform. However, this measure is confounded by swimming speed, not necessarily a cognitive factor, and path length between point of origin and platform is a parameter more closely related to spatial learning. Further parameters are the Gallagher measure, the average distance to the platform, and the Whishaw corridor test, which measures time and path in a strip directly leading from swim-start to platform. Other parameters are measured during probe trials: the escape platform is removed and the mice or rats are allowed to search for it for a fixed time (often 60 seconds). Variables measured are time and path length in quadrants, time near platform, and platform crossings.

Comparison to maze tasks 

Like other spatial tasks, such as the T-maze and radial arm maze, the Morris water navigation task is supposed to measure spatial memory, movement control, and cognitive mapping. The T-maze and radial arm maze are much more structured in comparison. The T-maze, for instance, only requires the rat or mouse to make a binary decision, choose left or right (or East or West). In the Morris water navigation task, on the other hand, the animal needs to decide continually where to go. Another reason this task became popular is that rats (but not mice) are natural swimmers, but dislike colder water (mice simply dislike water of any temperature), so in order to perform the task they do not need to be motivated by food deprivation or electrical shock. The mobility of the platform allows for experiments on learning and relearning. Also, the apparatus set-up and costs are relatively low.

Weaknesses 
When the searching times for the platform in the target quadrant are reduced in the probe trial, this is seen as direct evidence that the spatial memory of the mouse must be impaired. However, many times the reason for a lengthier amount of time spent looking for the platform, or the lack of searching in the target quadrant, has nothing to do with an effect on the mouse's spatial memory, but is actually due to other factors. A large study of performance in mice concluded that almost half of all variance in performance scores was due to differences in thigmotaxis, the tendency of animals to stay close to the walls of the pool. About 20% of the variability was explained by differing tendencies of mice to float passively in the water until "rescued" by the experimenter. Differences in spatial memory were only the third factor, explaining just 13% of the variation between animals' performance.

See also
Oasis maze
Barnes maze
Elevated plus maze

References

Animal testing mazes
Behavioral neuroscience